The following list are the graphically Latin letters in the Unicode Standard, regardless of whether they are defined as Latin script, as collated by shape (base letter) or by phonetic value. Many are hard-coded formatting variants. For example, the Q series starts out with full-width ｑ, bold 𝐪, italic 𝑞, bold italic 𝒒, script 𝓆, bold script 𝓺, Fraktur 𝔮, double-struck 𝕢, bold Fraktur 𝖖, sans-serif 𝗊, bold sans-serif 𝗾, italic sans-serif 𝘲, bold italic sans-serif 𝙦, monospace 𝚚. Small-capital, superscript, subscript and double-struck italic variants also appear, all of which can be handled by formatting or by choice of font when there is no semantic distinction to maintain.

a

b

c

d

e

f

g

h

i

j

k

l

m

n

o

p

q

r

s

t

u

v

w

x

y

z

other

See also
Universal Character Set characters
List of Latin-script letters
Latin script in Unicode

References 

Latin script